Halls Corner may refer to:
Halls Corner, California
Halls Corner, Michigan
Halls Corner, New Jersey
Halls Corner, New York, a place in New York